Police Report may refer to:

 Complaint, formal legal document
 Police Report (TV series), Hong Kong TV series
 Police Report (1934 film), German film
 Police Report (1939 film), German film